Timothy Devon Anderson Jr. (born June 23, 1993) is an American professional baseball shortstop for the Chicago White Sox of Major League Baseball (MLB). Anderson played college baseball at East Central Community College, and was selected in the first round of the 2013 MLB draft by the White Sox. He made his MLB debut in 2016. Anderson led the American League in batting average in 2019, won the Silver Slugger Award in 2020, and was an All-Star in 2021.

Early life and career
Anderson was born in Tuscaloosa, Alabama. His father, Tim Sr., was arrested on drug charges before he was born and served the first 15 years of Tim Jr.'s life in prison. His birth mother was already raising four children and was unable to care for Anderson as well, so he was raised by his aunt and uncle along with their three children. His grandfather took him to visit his father often, so that they could have a relationship.

Anderson attended Hillcrest High School in Tuscaloosa, Alabama. Anderson played little league baseball as a kid but eventually cut the sport out of his life up until his junior year of high school. He focused on basketball in his first two years of high school, but broke both of his legs during his sophomore year. In his junior year, he played both baseball and basketball. As a junior, Anderson batted .333 as a left fielder. In his senior year, Anderson played as an infielder and batted .420. He was a part of the state basketball championship winning team in his senior year.

Anderson enrolled at East Central Community College in Decatur, Mississippi, to play college baseball. East Central was the only school to offer Anderson a baseball scholarship. In his freshman season, Anderson batted .360 with four home runs, 37 runs batted in (RBIs), and 30 stolen bases without being caught stealing. However, he received no interest from Major League Baseball (MLB) teams, and was not selected in the 2012 MLB draft. Returning to East Central for his sophomore year, Anderson had a breakout season, leading all junior college baseball players with a .495 batting average. He was named a first-team National Junior College Athletic Association Division II All-American. He committed to transfer to the University of Alabama at Birmingham (UAB).

Professional career

Minor leagues (2013–2016)
The Chicago White Sox selected Anderson in the first round, with the 17th overall selection, in the 2013 MLB draft. Anderson opted to sign with the White Sox, rather than enroll at UAB, for a signing bonus of $2,164,000. Though expected to make his professional debut with the Bristol White Sox of the Rookie-level Appalachian League, the White Sox assigned Anderson to the Kannapolis Intimidators of the Class A South Atlantic League instead. He batted .277 with one home run, 21 RBIs, and 24 stolen bases in 68 games for Kannapolis.

In 2014, Anderson began the season with the Winston-Salem Dash of the Class A-Advanced Carolina League. He broke his wrist in late June, requiring surgery. In 68 games, Anderson had a .297 batting average, six home runs, and 10 stolen bases. He also committed 31 errors. When he returned in August, the White Sox promoted him to the Birmingham Barons of the Class AA Southern League, where he batted .364 in 10 games. The White Sox assigned Anderson to the Glendale Desert Dogs of the Arizona Fall League after the regular season.

The White Sox invited Anderson to spring training in 2015. He spent the season with Birmingham, and he batted .312 with five home runs and 49 stolen bases, while on defense he committed 25 errors. Invited to spring training again in 2016, the White Sox assigned him to the Charlotte Knights of the Class AAA International League at the beginning of the season. In 55 games for Charlotte, Anderson batted .304 with four home runs, 20 RBIs, and 11 stolen bases.

Chicago White Sox (2016–present)

2016–2018
On June 10, 2016, the White Sox designated Jimmy Rollins for assignment and promoted Anderson to the major leagues. Anderson made his MLB debut that day, hitting a double off of Ian Kennedy of the Kansas City Royals in his first at bat. Anderson batted .283 with nine home runs in 99 games for the White Sox.

Before the 2017 season, Anderson signed a six-year contract worth $25 million, with two club options for the 2023 and 2024 seasons. He struggled in April 2017, batting .204 and striking out 24 times in 22 games. For the 2017 season, Anderson batted .257/.276/.402, walked in 2.1% of his at bats (the lowest percentage in the major leagues), and had the lowest walks-per-strikeout ratio in the majors (0.08). On defense, he led the major leagues in errors, with 28, and in fielding errors (with 16) and throwing errors (with 12).

In 2018, Anderson had a .240 batting average with 20 home runs and 26 stolen bases. On defense, he tied for the major league lead in throwing errors, with 12.

2019–present
In 2019 he batted .335 (leading the major leagues)/.357/.508. He had the lowest walk percentage in the American League (2.9%). He had career highs in hits with 167, despite having 88 fewer plate appearances than in 2018. He also had a career high in doubles with 32, and runs with 81. On defense, he led all major league players in errors committed, with 26, and had the lowest fielding percentage of all major league shortstops (.951).

Overall with the 2020 Chicago White Sox, Anderson batted .322/.357/.529 with 45 runs (tied for the AL lead), ten home runs, and 21 RBIs in 49 games. He won a Silver Slugger Award that season.

Anderson was the cover athlete for the 2021 installment of the R.B.I. Baseball video game series. On July 10, 2021, Anderson was named to the 2021 MLB All-Star Game. At the MLB Field of Dreams Game on August 12, 2021, Anderson hit a walk-off home run in the bottom of the ninth inning off of Zack Britton to win the game for the White Sox over the New York Yankees, 9–8. Overall in 2021, Anderson batted .309/.338/.469 in 123 games hitting 17 home runs and 61 RBIs. He had the lowest walk percentage in the major leagues, at 4.0%.

During the White Sox game against the Cleveland Guardians on April 20, 2022, Anderson gave fans the finger. Anderson apologized after the game. MLB suspended him for one game, though he appealed the suspension.

In a 2019 interview, Anderson said that he kind of felt like "today's Jackie Robinson" in reference to him wanting to change baseball.  During a game on May 21, 2022 against the New York Yankees, Yankees third baseman Josh Donaldson mockingly called Anderson "Jackie". Later in the game, White Sox catcher Yasmani Grandal confronted Donaldson, leading to both teams clearing their benches. After the game, manager Tony La Russa later called Donaldson's comment "racist" and Anderson agreed with him. Donaldson was suspended one game for "inappropriate comments" and apologized to both Anderson and Robinson's widow.

Despite all the events, Anderson made the All-Star team for the second year in a row. Anderson was named the starter at shortstop for the American League becoming the first White Sox shortstop to start in the All-Star game since Luis Aparicio in 1970. In the game, Anderson went 1-for-2 with a single in the 4th.

On July 30, 2022, Anderson was thrown out of the game by umpire Nick Mahrley after arguing balls and strikes. Anderson became irate and he seemingly bumped Mahrley with his helmet to the umpire's cap. The next day, the league suspended Anderson three games and fined him an undisclosed amount for making illegal contact with an umpire, pending an appeal. On August 9, Anderson was placed on the IL with a torn hand ligament and was out for the rest of the season. Overall in 2022, Anderson appeared in 79 games with an average of .301 hitting 6 home runs and 25 RBI's.

In 2023, Anderson represented Team USA in the World Baseball Classic.

Personal life
Anderson and his wife, Bria (nee Evans), have two daughters. Their first daughter was born in 2016 and their second was born in 2019. The family reside in Chicago year-round.

In 2017, Anderson's best friend was shot and killed in Tuscaloosa; they were both godfathers to each others' daughters. This inspired Anderson to create a charitable foundation, called Anderson's League of Leaders, with the goal of supporting children in school and at home. The foundation financially supports interventions in various causes, including bullying and gun violence. Anderson has been known for doing charity work around the south and west sides of Chicago which he calls his "adopted hometown". In 2019, Anderson brought 75 kids from the south side of Chicago to the theater to watch the film 42 (2013), a biopic about baseball player Jackie Robinson.

References

External links

1993 births
American League All-Stars
American League batting champions
African-American baseball players
Living people
Sportspeople from Tuscaloosa, Alabama
Baseball players from Alabama
Major League Baseball shortstops
Chicago White Sox players
Silver Slugger Award winners
East Central Warriors baseball players
Kannapolis Intimidators players
Winston-Salem Dash players
Birmingham Barons players
Glendale Desert Dogs players
Charlotte Knights players
East Central Community College alumni
21st-century African-American sportspeople
2023 World Baseball Classic players